Sergey Evtuhov is a Russian painter, sculptor and author based in Vilnius, Lithuania. He has held over 30 personal exhibitions in Vilnius, Riga, Helsinki. His works are kept in private collections in the U.S., Canada, France, Russia, Lithuania and other countries.

Early life and education 

Sergey Evtuhov was born in Mogilev on February 2, 1953, in the family of high school teachers. Therein Mogilev he spent his childhood and teen years until he was drafted to the Soviet army, and served for 2 years in the strategic missile troops. In his youth, the future artist was thinking about a more traditional career. Therefore, having completed his military service, he got enrolled in Riga Technical University, Department of aviation engineering, from which he graduated in 1981.

Artist’s calling 

Sergey left aviation in 1991 in order to fully dedicate himself to painting. Evtuhov proved to be a prolific artist – he’s the author of multiple paintings, sculptures. He also wrote several books, one of which received Yuri Dolgorukiy Literature Award. Having held more than 30 personal exhibitions, Sergey Evtuhov treats each personal exhibition as a completely new creation, not just old paintings on a new place. The artist’s credo is to constantly search for new ideas, never exploiting the success of the past. In the interview to Lithuanian Courier, he says: “I never copied what I had found in the previous years because in my works there’s always pure search going on. This search leads me to victories.”  Sergey is also an experienced educator, author of unique teaching technique in the sphere of visual arts.

Evtuhov’s artistic style and the trend of absurdmatism 

Sergey Evtuhov’s works are characteristic of bright, expressive colors, usually with an absurd plot, or sometimes even devoid of plot as such.
„Plotless art sets the painter free from a search of explanations to his artistic creations, - says Sergey – Refusal of plot can only enhance the impact of all the elements and the characters of the painting"
The creative art of Sergey is difficult to fit into any particular artistic trend as it includes large palette of themes and scope of expressive means. The painter considers himself to belong to a new artistic trend of absurdmatism which he defines as “attempt to combine incongruous in order to engender harmony”

Literary series 
Sergey Evtuhov wrote three books, two of which won international literary awards How I Spent Summer (original title Как я провел лето. И хотел провести осень... Но осень сама чуть было меня не провела) and Thunderbird Proudly Hovers (Гордо реет буревестник, так похожий на антенну)

Monumental sculpture and nude sculpture 

In 2006 Sergey made his debut in the monumental sculpture with his exhibition held in honor of French sculptor Jacques Lipchitz. The exhibition was held in Lithuanian spa town Druskininkai, the native town of Lipchitz. Immense sculptures could not be moved into any gallery under the roof, as a result, they were displayed in a picturesque setting between 2 lakes. Special attention of lovers of art and critics was given to Enamored Sailor, Wounded Tiger and King and Queen.
He also held exhibitions presenting his nude sculptures which mostly represent the characters of the paintings of Edgar Degas, Amedeo Modigliani,  Toulouse-Lautrec,  Paul Gauguin. These sculptures were made of chamotte clay. Sergey Evtuhov’s sculpture is characteristic of unusual geometric plasticity, which is quite rare. This is not cubism of the beginning of the 20th century, but a completely new aesthetics.

Art is not for sale, only the pieces 

In 2006 painter Evtuhov draw public attention and criticism when he decided to sell his painting The Firefighters visiting designers, priced over 1 million dollars, by pieces. The buyers couldn’t take an actual piece with them, but their names were published and promoted as sponsors of the art and co-owners of this artistic work. As a result, the painting was kept by the artist. Overall Sergey is known for unwillingness to sell many of his masterpieces.

Continuation of famous Henri Matisse’ series 

One of the recent projects of painter Evtuhov is connected with the artistic genius of Henri Matisse. Sergey made up his mind to continue famous works of Matisse – The Dance and The Music, kept in the Hermitage Museum.
First appeared in The Painting. In the same palette: figures are in red, ground – in green, the sky – in blue. The size of the canvas is the same as Matisse’: 2.60 by 3.90 i.e. each painting is almost 4 meters long. But if Matisse deprived his characters of individuality on purpose, so that the depicted would be perceived by the audience as a comprehensive whole, Sergey selected figures for his painting from the numerous sketches of the French painter.
The second picture was named The Baithing (or The Meditation) and was taken from an unrealized project. Matisse was planning to paint the third picture, but the customer – collector Schukin – confined himself only to The Dance and The Music. Sergey didn’t confine himself… and so appeared the work The Baithing (or The Meditation).

Gallery

References 

1953 births
Living people